Neanderthals became extinct around 40,000 years ago. This timing, based on research published in Nature in 2014, is much earlier than previous estimates, and derives from improved radiocarbon dating methods analyzing 40 sites from Spain to Russia. Evidence for continued Neanderthal presence in the Iberian Peninsula 37,000 years ago was published in 2017.

Various hypotheses on the causes of Neanderthal extinction implicate:

 violence;
 parasites and pathogens;
 competitive replacement;
 extinction by interbreeding with early modern human populations;
 natural catastrophes;
 climate change;
 inbreeding depression.

It seems unlikely that any single one of these hypotheses is sufficient on its own; rather, multiple factors probably contributed to the demise of an already low population.

Possible coexistence before extinction

In research published in Nature in 2014, an analysis of radiocarbon dates from forty Neanderthal sites from Spain to Russia found that the Neanderthals disappeared in Europe between 41,000 and 39,000  years ago with 95% probability. The study also found with the same probability that modern humans and Neanderthals overlapped in Europe for between 2,600 and 5,400 years. Modern humans reached Europe between 45,000 and 43,000 years ago. Improved radiocarbon dating published in 2015 indicates that Neanderthals disappeared around 40,000 years ago, which overturns older carbon dating which indicated that Neanderthals may have lived as recently as 24,000 years ago, including in refugia on the south coast of the Iberian peninsula such as Gorham's Cave. 
Zilhão et al. (2017) argue for pushing this date forward by some 3,000 years, to 37,000 years ago.
Inter-stratification of Neanderthal and modern human remains has been suggested, but is disputed. Stone tools that have been proposed to be linked to Neanderthals have been found at Byzovya (:ru:Бызовая) in the polar Urals, and dated to 31,000 to 34,000 years ago.

Possible cause of extinction

Violence
Kwang Hyun Ho discusses the possibility that Neanderthal extinction was either precipitated or hastened by violent conflict with Homo sapiens. Violence in early hunter-gatherer societies usually occurred as a result of resource competition following natural disasters. It is therefore plausible to suggest that violence, including primitive warfare, would have transpired between the two human species. The hypothesis that early humans violently replaced Neanderthals was first proposed by French paleontologist Marcellin Boule (the first person to publish an analysis of a Neanderthal) in 1912.

Parasites and pathogens
Pathogens or parasites transmitted by humans may have passed to Neanderthals. Neanderthals had poor protection to illnesses they hadn't been exposed to, therefore Homo sapiens' resistant diseases may have been devastating to them. If viruses could easily jump between these two similar species, maybe because they lived near together, Homo sapiens might have infected Neanderthals and prevented the epidemic from burning out as Neanderthal numbers declined. The same process may also explain Homo sapiens' resilience to Neanderthal diseases and parasites. Novel human diseases likely moved from Africa into Eurasia. This purported "African advantage" remained until the agricultural revolution 10,000 years ago in Eurasia, after which domesticated animals surpassed other primates as the most prevalent source of new human infections, replacing the "African advantage" with a "Eurasian advantage". The catastrophic impact of Eurasian viruses on Native American populations in the historical past offers us a sense of how modern humans may have affected hominin predecessor groups in Eurasia 40,000 years ago. Human and Neanderthal genomes and disease or parasite adaptations may give insight on this. 

Infectious illness interactions may express the prolonged period of stagnation before the modification, as per disease ecology. Mathematical models have been used to make forecasts for future investigations, giving information about inter-species interactions during the shift between the Middle and Upper Paleolithic eras. This can be useful given the sparse material record from this time and the potential of DNA sequencing and dating technology. Such modeling, together with modern technology and prehistoric archaeological methodologies, may provide a fresh understanding of this time in human origins.

Competitive replacement

Species specific disadvantages 

Slight competitive advantage on the part of modern humans may have accounted for Neanderthals' decline on a timescale of thousands of years.

Generally small and widely dispersed fossil sites suggest that Neanderthals lived in less numerous and socially more isolated groups than contemporary Homo sapiens. Tools such as Mousterian flint stone flakes and Levallois points are remarkably sophisticated from the outset, yet they have a slow rate of variability and general technological inertia is noticeable during the entire fossil period. Artifacts are of utilitarian nature, and symbolic behavioral traits are undocumented before the arrival of modern humans in Europe around 40,000 to 35,000 years ago.

The noticeable morphological differences in skull shape between the two human species also have cognitive implications. These include the Neanderthals' smaller parietal lobes and cerebellum, areas implicated in tool use, visuospatial integration, numeracy, creativity, and higher-order conceptualization. The differences, while slight, would have possibly been enough to affect natural selection and may underlie and explain the differences in social behaviors, technological innovation, and artistic output.

Jared Diamond, a supporter of competitive replacement, points out in his book The Third Chimpanzee that the replacement of Neanderthals by modern humans is comparable to patterns of behavior that occur whenever people with advanced technology clash with people with less developed technology.

Division of labor
In 2006, two anthropologists of the University of Arizona proposed an efficiency explanation for the demise of the Neanderthals. In an article titled "What's a Mother to Do? The Division of Labor among Neanderthals and Modern Humans in Eurasia", it was posited that Neanderthal division of labor between the sexes was less developed than Middle paleolithic Homo sapiens. Both male and female Neanderthals participated in the single occupation of hunting big game, such as bison, deer, gazelles, and wild horses. This hypothesis proposes that the Neanderthal's relative lack of labor division resulted in less efficient extraction of resources from the environment as compared to Homo sapiens.

Anatomical differences and running ability
Researchers such as Karen L. Steudel of the University of Wisconsin have highlighted the relationship of Neanderthal anatomy (shorter and stockier than that of modern humans) and the ability to run and the requirement of energy (30% more).

Nevertheless, in the recent study, researchers Martin Hora and Vladimir Sladek of Charles University in Prague show that Neanderthal lower limb configuration, particularly the combination of robust knees, long heels, and short lower limbs, increased the effective mechanical advantage of the Neanderthal knee and ankle extensors, thus reducing the force needed and the energy spent for locomotion significantly. The walking cost of the Neanderthal male is now estimated to be 8–12% higher than that of anatomically modern males, whereas the walking cost of the Neanderthal female is considered to be virtually equal to that of anatomically modern females.

Other researchers, like Yoel Rak, from Tel-Aviv University in Israel, have noted that the fossil records show that Neanderthal pelvises in comparison to modern human pelvises would have made it much harder for Neanderthals to absorb shocks and to bounce off from one step to the next, giving modern humans another advantage over Neanderthals in running and walking ability. However, Rak also notes that all archaic humans had wide pelvises, indicating that this is the ancestral morphology and that modern humans underwent a shift towards narrower pelvises in the late Pleistocene.

Modern humans and alliance with dogs 
Pat Shipman argues that the domestication of the dog gave modern humans an advantage when hunting. Evidence shows the oldest remains of domesticated dogs were found in Belgium (31,700 BP) and in Siberia (33,000 BP).  A survey of early sites of modern humans and Neanderthals with faunal remains across Spain, Portugal and France provided an overview of what modern humans and Neanderthals ate. Rabbit became more frequent, while large mammals – mainly eaten by the Neanderthals – became increasingly rare. In 2013, DNA testing on the "Altai dog", a paleolithic dog's remains from the Razboinichya Cave (Altai Mountains), has linked this 33,000-year-old dog with the present lineage of Canis familiaris.

Interbreeding

Interbreeding can account for only a certain degree of Neanderthal population decrease. A homogeneous absorption of an entire species is a rather unrealistic idea. This would also be counter to strict versions of the Recent African Origin, since it would imply that at least part of the genome of Europeans would descend from Neanderthals, whose ancestors left Africa at least 350,000 years ago.

The most vocal proponent of the hybridization hypothesis is Erik Trinkaus of Washington University in St. Louis. Trinkaus claims various fossils as hybrid individuals, including the  "child of Lagar Velho", a skeleton found at  Lagar Velho in Portugal. In a 2006 publication co-authored by Trinkaus, the fossils found in 1952 in the cave of Peștera Muierilor, Romania, are likewise claimed as hybrids.

Genetic studies indicate some form of hybridization between archaic humans and modern humans had taken place after modern humans emerged from Africa. An estimated 1–4% of the DNA in Europeans and Asians (e.g. French, Chinese and Papua probands) is non-modern, and shared with ancient Neanderthal DNA rather than with sub-Saharan Africans (e.g. Yoruba and San  probands).

Modern-human findings in Abrigo do Lagar Velho, Portugal allegedly featuring Neanderthal admixtures have been published. However, the interpretation of the Portuguese specimen is disputed.

Jordan, in his work Neanderthal, points out that without some interbreeding, certain features on some "modern" skulls of Eastern European Cro-Magnon heritage are hard to explain. In another study, researchers have recently found in Peştera Muierilor, Romania, remains of European humans from ~37,000–42,000 years ago who possessed mostly diagnostic "modern" anatomical features, but also had distinct Neanderthal features not present in ancestral modern humans in Africa, including a large bulge at the back of the skull, a more prominent projection around the elbow joint, and a narrow socket at the shoulder joint.

The Neanderthal genome project published papers in 2010 and 2014 stating that Neanderthals contributed to the DNA of modern humans, including most humans outside sub-Saharan Africa, as well as a few populations in sub-Saharan Africa, through interbreeding, likely between 50,000 and 60,000 years ago. Recent studies also show that a few Neanderthals began mating with ancestors of modern humans long before the large "out of Africa migration" of the present day non-Africans, as early as 100,000 years ago. In 2016, research indicated that there were three distinct episodes of interbreeding between modern humans and Neanderthals: the first encounter involved the ancestors of non-African modern humans, probably soon after leaving Africa; the second, after the ancestral Melanesian group had branched off (and subsequently had a unique episode of interbreeding with Denisovans); and the third, involving the ancestors of East Asians only.

While interbreeding is viewed as the most parsimonious interpretation of the genetic discoveries, the authors point out they cannot conclusively rule out an alternative scenario, in which the source population of non-African modern humans was already more closely related to Neanderthals than other Africans were, due to ancient genetic divisions within Africa. Among the genes shown to differ between present-day humans and Neanderthals were RPTN, SPAG17, CAN15, TTF1 and PCD16.

New evidence was discovered at Grotte Mandrin in Malataverne, France, dating back by 10,000 years. Six of the individuals were recognized as Neanderthal, but a modern human upper molar was recovered in between Neanderthal sections. At Grotte Mandrin, the existence of modern human molar inside the Neronian layer prompted researchers to connect this stone tool manufacturing to Homo sapiens. The existence of the homo sapiens molar beside the Neronian solidifies the narrative: Neanderthals and modern humans replaced each other multiple times in same area. Finds at Grotte Mandrin imply the Mediterranean region had a crucial importance in shaping humans' spread into Western Eurasia. 

Recent research in northern Spain suggests that Neanderthals vanished earlier in Vasco-Cantabrian eastern and southern Iberia. The projected outcome will assist assess the consequences for region systems of resource extraction, subsistence techniques, and environmental–human connections in the Neanderthals' death and modern humans' evolutionary progress.

Recent genetic evidence has revealed kinship patterns among recovered Neanderthal remains that suggests inbreeding practices  such as pairings between half-siblings and/or uncle/aunt and niece/nephew. Researchers hypothesize that Neanderthals may have become isolated into small groups during harsh climatic conditions which contributed to inbreeding behaviours. Due to the lack of genetic diversity, Neanderthal populations would have become more vulnerable to climatic changes, diseases and other stressors which may have contributed to their extinction. A similar model to the inbreeding hypothesis can be seen among endangered lowland gorillas. Their populations are so small that it has caused inbreeding, making them even more vulnerable to extinction.

Climate change

Neanderthals went through a demographic crisis in Western Europe that seems to coincide with climate change that resulted in a period of extreme cold in Western Europe. "The fact that Neanderthals in Western Europe were nearly extinct, but then recovered long before they came into contact with modern humans came as a complete surprise to us," said Love Dalén, associate professor at the Swedish Museum of Natural History in Stockholm. If so, this would indicate that Neanderthals may have been very sensitive to climate change.

The data reveal that sudden climatic change, although crucial locally, had a limited effect on the worldwide Neanderthal population. Interbreeding and assimilation, which were hypothesized as causes in the death of European Neanderthal populations are successful only for low levels of food competition. More specific genes calculations of the total amount of interbreeding individuals during the last glacial epoch are needed to restrict the influence of interbreeding in my model. These figures are questionable. To simulate numerous interbreeding occurrences, start the model early (125 ka). Future research will examine models of interbreeding, and hybridization may be evaluated using genomic records from last ice age (Fu et al., 2016).

Natural catastrophe

The argument has been developed by Golovanova et al. The hypothesis posits that although Neanderthals had encountered several Interglacials during 250,000 years in Europe, inability to adapt their hunting methods caused their extinction facing H. sapiens competition when Europe changed into a sparsely vegetated steppe and semi-desert during the last Ice Age. Studies of sediment layers at Mezmaiskaya Cave suggest a severe reduction of plant pollen. The damage to plant life would have led to a corresponding decline in plant-eating mammals hunted by the Neanderthals.

References

External links
 Hey Good Lookin': Early Humans Dug Neanderthals – audio report by NPR (6 May 2010)

Extinction
Upper Paleolithic
European archaeology
Pleistocene extinctions